Aldo Scavarda (born 22 August 1923 in Turin, Italy) is an Italian cinematographer who collaborated with Michelangelo Antonioni (L'Avventura, 1960), Bernardo Bertolucci (Prima della rivoluzione, 1964), Mauro Bolognini (La giornata ballorda, 1960), Luigi Comencini (A cavallo della tigre, 1961), Salvatore Samperi, Sergio Sollima, and others.

In 1969, for his cinematography on Salvatore Samperi's Grazie, zia he won the Silver Ribbon prize.

In 1975, he directed his only film La linea del fiume, which won the Golden Gryphon prize at the Giffoni Film Festival, in 1976.

Selected filmography
 The Two Rivals (1960)
 Un gioco per Eveline (1971)

External links

1923 births
Living people
Italian cinematographers